Ronan Lynch (born 1996) is an Irish hurler who plays as a left corner-forward for the Limerick senior team.

Born in Limerick, Lynch first played competitive hurling during his schooling at Ardscoil Rís. He arrived on the inter-county scene at the age of fifteen when he first linked up with the Limerick minor team before later joining the under-21 side. He joined the senior team during the 2015 championship.

At club level Lynch plays with Na Piarsaigh.

Playing career

College

During his schooling at Ardscoil Rís in Limerick, Lynch established himself as a key member of the senior hurling team. In 2014 he won a Harty Cup medal following a 2-13 to 0-4 trouncing of Limerick rivals Scoil na Trionóide, Doon.

Minor and under-21

Lynch was just fifteen-years-old when he first played for Limerick as a member of the minor team on 2 May 2012. He scored 0-11 on his debut in a 0-16 to 1-12 Munster quarter-final defeat of Cork.

In 2013 Lynch was at left wing-back as Limerick faced Waterford in the provincial decider. As Waterford looked to be heading for victory, a last-minute goal from substitute Tom Morrissey ensured a 2-19 apiece draw. The replay was also a close affair, however, Cian Lynch's first-half stoppage time goal proved decisive as Limerick ended a 29-year wait for the title with a 1-20 to 4-8 victory. It was Lynch's first Munster medal.

Lynch was eligible for the minor grade once again in 2014, as Waterford faced the team in the Munster final for a second year in succession. Limerick looked all set to retain their title when leading their opponents by three points in added time, however, Waterford substitute Shane Ryan struck for a dramatic late goal to send the game to a replay. The replay was also a close affair, however, Limerick pulled away in the end to secure a 0-24 to 0-18 victory and a second Munster medal for Lynch. On 7 September 2014 Limerick faced Kilkenny in the All-Ireland decider. A 2-5 haul from Kilkenny corner-forward John Walsh ensured a 2-17 to 0-19 defeat for Lynch's side.

Limerick football panel 2019-
In 2019, Lynch joined the Limerick Senior Football panel after receiving the call-up from Billy Lee, making one championship appearance. It was feared that a lack of pace would be his downfall but his big frame and aerial ball-winning abilities was a major asset the Limerick footballers cause. When the big man would be introduced as an impact sub, one could hear the auld lads in the stand cream themselves to the cries of 'lump the ball into big lynch, he'll do untold'. Whether he is part of the Football panel for 2020 is unknown. Rumors are circulating nationwide that he contracted the COVID-19 virus while he was studying Medicine in University of Limerick.

Career statistics

Club

Honours

Player

Ardscoil Rís
 Dr Harty Cup (1): 2014

Limerick
All-Ireland Under-21 Hurling Championship (2): 2015, 2017
Munster Under-21 Hurling Championship (2): 2015, 2017
 Munster Minor Hurling Championship (2): 2013, 2014

Na Piarsaigh
 Limerick Senior Club Hurling Championship (2): 2015, 2017
 Munster Senior Club Hurling Championship (2): 2015, 2017
 All-Ireland Senior Club Hurling Championship (1): 2016

Individual

Awards
 Munster Minor Hurler of the Year (1): 2013

References

1996 births
Living people
Na Piarsaigh (Limerick) hurlers
Limerick inter-county hurlers